Gil Pordeh Sar (also Romanized as Gīl Pordeh Sar; also known as Gīleh Pordesar, Gīl-e Pardesar, Gol Pardehsar, Gol Pardsar, Gul-Pardasar, and Gulpardsar) is a village in Sangar Rural District, Sangar District, Rasht County, Gilan Province, Iran. At the 2006 census, its population was 1,865, in 512 families.

References 

Populated places in Rasht County